is a train station located in Kyōtanabe, Kyoto, Japan. The station is served by Kintetsu Kyoto Line. It is one of the nearby stations of Kyotanabe Campus of Doshisha University. Its station number is B17.

The station opened on July 5, 1954.

Lines
Kintetsu Railway
Kyoto Line

Layout
The station has two platforms serving two tracks. It has a wheelchair accessible bathroom and an elevator.

Platforms

Adjacent stations

Surrounding area
Doshishamae Station
It takes about 5 minutes from here on foot.

Reference

External links
Official Website

Railway stations in Kyoto Prefecture
Railway stations in Japan opened in 1954